Nadege Uwamwezi (born 1993), is a Rwandan actress. One of the most popular actresses in Rwandan telelvision, Nadege is best known for the role 'Nana' in TV series, City Maid. Apart from acting, she is also a singer and fashion designer.

Personal life
Uwanmwezi was born in 1993 in Rwanda.

She opened a boutique named 'Nana Fashion Shop' with her brand name. She had one son from her first marriage, Ganza Benny Lucky.

Career
Prior to acting, Nadege was a singer who sung under the name 'Queen Nadege'. She was part of a band called 'The Queens' where they sung the 'Ryajambo' in 2009.

She joined Kwetu Film Institute to study drama. Later, she was introduced to acting by Kennedy Mazimpaka, after he noticed her acting skills at Kwetu. Mazimpaka gave her a minor role in the film Rwasibo, which became her maiden cinema acting role. In 2016, she acted in the television serial Mutoni as the titular lead role.

Nadege is known as Catherine in film called Catherine series, directed by Muniru Habiyakare and Munyaneza Prince, it is produced by Apoline Uwimana and Agape house films, this film is a story of Ingabire Esther  and Catherine is written by Apoline Uwimana and Muniru Habiyakare, it is a film of a young girl called Catherine abandonment by her Father and she killed him without knowing it. it was a mission of her mother.

Later on she acted in several popular films and television series that include Catherine and Nkubito ya Nyamunsi. In 2016, she acted in the television series City Maid. The show became highly popular among the public and she was often known as 'Nana'.

Filmography

References

External links
 

1993 births
Living people
Rwandan actresses
Rwandan women singers